The Invaders Plan is a novel by L. Ron Hubbard published in 1985.

Plot summary
The Invaders Plan is the first novel in the Mission Earth novel series.

Reception
Dave Langford reviewed The Invaders Plan for White Dwarf #80, and stated that "Partly rugous and partly squamous, first of a ten-book sequence, it leers and squatters beneath the gibbous moon."

Reviews
Review by Fred Runk (1985) in Fantasy Review, November 1985
Review by Tom Easton (1986) in Analog Science Fiction/Science Fact, April 1986
Review by Don D'Ammassa (1986) in Science Fiction Chronicle, #80 May 1986
Review by Ken Lake (1987) in Vector 138

References

1985 American novels
Novels by L. Ron Hubbard